Mountain Grove is an unincorporated area in Black Creek Township, Luzerne County, Pennsylvania, United States.

References

Unincorporated communities in Luzerne County, Pennsylvania
Unincorporated communities in Pennsylvania